Aref Tayfour is the former Deputy Speaker of the Iraqi National Assembly from 2010 to 2014. He was succeeded by Aram Sheikh Mohammad from the Gorran Movement. A member of the Kurdistan Democratic Party, he was elected to the post by the Assembly on 22 April 2006 and after new legislative elections in 2010 he was re-elected to the post in November 2010. He also served as the Deputy President of the National Assembly under the Iraqi Transitional Government.

Tayfour was born in Dokan, As Sulaymaniyah Governorate, Iraqi Kurdistan in 1945. He graduated in law from Baghdad University in 1970. He originally joined the Hiywa Kurdish party before joining the KDP in 1967. He fled to Iran in 1974 and then to Austria. He returned to Iraqi Kurdistan in 1991. In 2003 he returned to Baghdad to lead the KDP's branch.

Sources
 
 

Living people
Members of the Council of Representatives of Iraq
Kurdistan Democratic Party politicians
Year of birth missing (living people)